John Michael Agee (June 7, 1938 – February 1, 1990) was an American football player and coach. He served as the head football coach at Georgetown University in Washington, D.C. from 1966 to 1967.

References

External links
 

1938 births
1990 deaths
American football defensive backs
American football quarterbacks
Georgetown Hoyas football coaches
Washington State Cougars football players
People from Colfax, Washington
Players of American football from Washington (state)